Old Tupi, Ancient Tupi or Classical Tupi (also spelled as Tupí) is an extinct Tupian language which was spoken by the aboriginal Tupi people of Brazil, mostly those who inhabited coastal regions in South and Southeast Brazil. It belongs to the Tupi–Guarani language family, and has a written history spanning the 16th, 17th, and early 18th centuries. In the early colonial period, Tupi was used as a lingua franca throughout Brazil by Europeans and aboriginal Americans, and had literary usage, but it was later suppressed almost to extinction. Today, only one modern descendant is living, the Nheengatu language.

History
Old Tupi was first spoken by the Tupinambá people, who lived under cultural and social conditions very unlike those found in Europe. It is quite different from Indo-European languages in phonology, morphology, and grammar, but it was adopted by many Luso-Brazilians born in Brazil as a lingua franca known as Língua Geral.

It belonged to the Tupi–Guarani language family, which stood out among other South American languages for the vast territory it covered. Until the 16th century, these languages were found throughout nearly the entirety of the Brazilian coast, from Pará to Santa Catarina, and the River Plate basin. Today, Tupi languages are still heard in Brazil (states of Maranhão, Pará, Amapá, Amazonas, Mato Grosso, Mato Grosso do Sul, Goiás, São Paulo, Paraná, Santa Catarina, Rio Grande do Sul, Rio de Janeiro, and Espírito Santo), as well as in French Guiana, Venezuela, Colombia, Peru, Bolivia, Paraguay, and Argentina.

It is a common mistake to speak of the "Tupi–Guarani language": Tupi, Guarani and a number of other minor or major languages all belong to the Tupian language family, in the same sense that English, Romanian, and Sanskrit belong to the Indo-European language family. One of the main differences between the two languages was the replacement of Tupi  by the glottal fricative  in Guarani.

The first accounts of the Old Tupi language date back from the early 16th century, but the first written documents containing actual information about it were produced from 1575 onwards – when Jesuits André Thévet and José de Anchieta began to translate Catholic prayers and biblical stories into the language. Another foreigner, Jean de Lery, wrote the first (and possibly only) Tupi "phrasebook", in which he transcribed entire dialogues. Lery's work is the best available record of how Tupi was actually spoken.

In the first two or three centuries of Brazilian history, nearly all colonists coming to Brazil would learn the tupinambá variant of Tupi, as a means of communication with both the Indigenous people and with other early colonists who had adopted the language.

The Jesuits, however, not only learned to speak tupinambá, but also encouraged the Indians to keep it. As a part of their missionary work, they translated some literature into it and also produced some original work written directly in Tupi. José de Anchieta reportedly wrote more than 4,000 lines of poetry in tupinambá (which he called lingua Brasilica) and the first Tupi grammar. Luís Figueira was another important figure of this time, who wrote the second Tupi grammar, published in 1621. In the second half of the 18th century, the works of Anchieta and Figueira were republished and Father Bettendorf wrote a new and more complete catechism. By that time, the language had made its way into the clergy and was the de facto national language of Brazil – though it was probably seldom written, as the Roman Catholic Church held a near monopoly of literacy.

When the Portuguese Prime Minister Marquis of Pombal expelled the Jesuits from Brazil in 1759, the language started to wane fast, as few Brazilians were literate in it. Besides, a new rush of Portuguese immigration had been taking place since the early 18th century, due to the discovery of gold, diamonds, and gems in the interior of Brazil; these new colonists spoke only their mother tongue. Old Tupi survived as a spoken language (used by Europeans and Indian populations alike) only in isolated inland areas, far from the major urban centres. Its use by a few non-Indian speakers in those isolated areas would last for over a century still.

Tupi research 

When the Portuguese first arrived on the shores of modern-day Brazil, most of the tribes they encountered spoke very closely related dialects. The Portuguese (and particularly the Jesuit priests who accompanied them) set out to proselytise the natives. To do so most effectively, doing so in the natives' own languages was convenient, so the first Europeans to study Tupi were those priests.

The priests modeled their analysis of the new language after the one with which they had already experienced: Latin, which they had studied in the seminary. In fact, the first grammar of Tupi – written by the Jesuit  priest José de Anchieta in 1595 – is structured much like a contemporary Latin grammar. While this structure is not optimal, it certainly served its purpose of allowing its intended readership (Catholic priests familiar with Latin grammars) to get enough of a basic grasp of the language to be able to communicate with and evangelise the natives. Also, the grammar sometimes regularised or glossed over some regional differences in the expectation that the student, once "in the field", would learn these finer points of the particular dialect through use with his flock.

Significant works were a Jesuit catechism of 1618, with a second edition of 1686; another grammar written in 1687 by another Jesuit priest, Luís Figueira; an anonymous dictionary of 1795 (again published by the Jesuits); a dictionary published by Antônio Gonçalves Dias, a well-known 19th century Brazilian poet and scholar, in 1858; and a chrestomathy published by Dr Ernesto Ferreira França in 1859.

Considering the breadth of its use both in time and space, this language is particularly poorly documented in writing, particularly the dialect of São Paulo spoken in the South.

Phonology 

The phonology of tupinambá has some interesting and unusual features. For instance, it does not have the lateral approximant  or the multiple vibrant rhotic consonant . It also has a rather small inventory of consonants and a large number of pure vowels (12).

This led to a Brazilian pun about this language, that Indians não têm fé, nem lei, nem rei (have neither faith, nor law, nor king) as the words fé (faith), lei (law) and rei (king) could not be pronounced by a native Tupi speaker (they would say pé, re'i and re'i). It is also a double pun because Brazil has not had a king for more than two centuries.

Vowels 

They are pronounced with the mouth open and the palate relaxed, not blocking the air from resounding through the nostrils. These approximations, however, must be taken with caution, as no actual recording exists, and Tupi had at least seven known dialects.

Consonants

Alternative view 
According to Nataniel Santos Gomes, however, the phonetic inventory of Tupi was simpler:
 Consonants:
 p, t, k, ‘
 b
 s, x
 m, n, ñ
 û, î
 r
 Vowels
 i, y, u, ĩ, ỹ, ũ
 e, o, õ, ẽ
 a, ã

This scheme does not regard Ŷ as a separate semivowel, does not consider the existence of G, and does not differentiate between the two types of NG ( and ), probably because it does not regard MB, ND and NG as independent phonemes, but mere combinations of P, T, and K with nasalization.

Santos Gomes also remarks that the stop consonants shifted easily to nasal stops, which is attested by the fitful spelling of words like umbu (umu, ubu, umbu, upu, umpu) in the works of the early missionaries and by the surviving dialects.

According to most sources, Tupi semivowels were more consonantal than their IPA counterparts. The Î, for instance, was rather fricative, thus resembling a very slight , and Û had a distinct similarity with the voiced stop  (possibly via , which would likewise be a fricative counterpart of the labiovelar semivowel), thus being sometimes written gu. As a consequence of that character, Tupi loanwords in Brazilian Portuguese often have j for Î and gu for Û.

Writing system 
It would have been almost impossible to reconstruct the phonology of Tupi if it did not have a wide geographic distribution. The surviving Amazonian Nhengatu and the close Guarani correlates (Mbyá, Nhandéva, Kaiowá and Paraguayan Guarani) provide material that linguistic research can still use for an approximate reconstruction of the language.

Scientific reconstruction of Tupi suggests that Anchieta either simplified or overlooked the phonetics of the actual language when he was devising his grammar and his dictionary.

The writing system employed by Anchieta is still the basis for most modern scholars. It is easily typed with regular Portuguese or French typewriters and computer keyboards (but not with character sets such as ISO-8859-1, which cannot produce ẽ, ĩ, ũ, ŷ and ỹ).

Its key features are:
 The tilde indicating nasalisation: a → ã.
 The circumflex accent indicating a semivowel: i → î.
 The acute accent indicating the stressed syllable: abá.
 The use of the letter x for the voiceless palatal fricative , a spelling convention common in the languages of the Iberian Peninsula but unusual elsewhere.
 The use of the digraphs yg (for Ŷ), gu (for ), ss (to make intervocalic S unvoiced), and of j to represent the semivowel .
 Hyphens are not used to separate the components of compounds except in the dictionary or for didactical purposes.

Verbs
In Old Tupi, verb conjugation is done at the beginning of the word. In addition, verbs can represent a present, past, or future action because, unlike Portuguese, they do not express time. (The future, in particular, is done by adding the particle -ne to the end of the sentence, but this does not change the fact that the verb itself does not express time.)

* a'e means this/these or that/those, but it can also be used as a third-person personal pronoun, both singular and plural.

Verb moods 
Tupi verbs are divided into its verbal and its nominal forms. Each division contains its respective verb moods.

Nouns 
All nouns in old Tupi end in a vowel. In the case of a verb or adjective substantivized, the suffix -a is added, if it does not already end in a vowel.

 Sem: to exit. Sema: the going out, the exit
 Pererek: to jump. Perereka: the jump, the leap.
 Só (verb): to go. Só (noun): the going, the going away.
 Porang: beautiful. Poranga: the beauty

The same occurs when a noun and an adjective are in composition. In this way:

 Kunhãporanga: beautiful woman (kunhã, woman; porang, beautiful; a, suffix)

Noun tenses 

Unlike the Portuguese language, the tense of an action, in old Tupi, is expressed by the noun, not the verb. Such tenses are future, past and a time called "unreal", which is similar to the future perfect, of Portuguese. They are indicated, respectively, by the adjectives -ram, -pûer and -rambûer. These, when in composition with the noun, receive the suffix -a, as explained above.

 Future: ka'a-ram-a = forest that will be (that has not yet been born; ka'a means forest)
 Past: ka'a-pûer-a = forest that was (place where there is no more forest; hence the word capoeira)
 Unreal: ybyrá-rambûer-a = tree that would be (if it had not been cut down)

Augmentative and diminutive 
The degrees of the noun (augmentative and diminutive) are made by the suffixes "-'ĩ' or '-'i'", for the diminutive, and "-ûasu' or '-usu'" for the augmentative (these suffixes may suffer several phonetic transformations. Here are some examples with their explanations:

{| class="wikitable"
|+
! colspan="2" |Diminutive 
! colspan="2" |Augmentative
|-
! colspan="2" |-'ĩ ou -'i 
! colspan="2" |-ûasu ou -usu
|-
|Gûyra'ĩ
|Little bird
|Ygûasu|Big river ('''y means river; the gwas added later by the colonizers)
|-
|Ita'ĩ
|Pebbles (ita means stone)
|Kunumĩgûasu
|Menino grande, moço
|-
|Pitangĩ
|Little child, baby
(Child is pitanga)
|Ybytyrusu
|Mountain range
(from ybytyra, mountain)
|}

Numerals
In Old Tupi, there are only numerals from one to four, both cardinal and ordinal, as the need for mathematical precision was small in a primitive economy. Cardinal numerals can either come after or before the noun they refer to, while ordinals only come after. For example, in the case of cardinal numbers, "mokõî pykasu" and "pykasu mokõî" are equivalent terms, meaning "two pigeons". In the case of ordinals, "ta'yr-ypy" means "first son (of a man)" and "'ara mosapyra" means "third day".

 Postpositions 
They are the same as prepositions, but they come after the term they refer to. They are divided into unstressed postpositions, which are appended to the previous word, and stressed postpositions, which are written separately.

Just like in Portuguese or English, some verbs require certain postpositions:
 "Pedo osykyîé o sy suí" (Peter is afraid of his mother; the verb "sykyîé" requires the preposition "suí")
 "I ruba oma'ẽ o ta'yra resé" (The father looks at his son; the verb "ma'ẽ" requires "resé"

 Grammatical structure 
Tupi was an agglutinative language with moderate degree of fusional features (nasal mutation of stop consonants in compounding, the use of some prefixes and suffixes), although Tupi is not a polysynthetic language.

Tupi parts of speech did not follow the same conventions of Indo-European languages:
 Verbs are "conjugated" for person (by means of prepositioning subject or object pronouns) but not for tense or mood (the very notion of mood is absent). All verbs are in the present tense.
 Nouns are "declined" for tense by means of suffixing the aspect marker (Nominal TAM) but not for gender or number.
 There is a distinction of nouns in two classes: "higher" (for things related to human beings or spirits) and "lower" (for things related to animals or inanimate beings). The usual manifestation of the distinction was the use of the prefixes t- for high-class nouns and s- for low-class ones, so that tesá meant "human eye", and sesá meant "the eye of an animal". Some authors argue that it is a type of gender inflection.
 Adjectives cannot be used in the place of nouns, neither as the subject nor as the object nucleus (in fact, they cannot be used alone).

Tupi had a split-intransitive grammatical alignment. Verbs were preceded by pronouns, which could be subject or object forms. Subject pronouns like a- "I" expressed the person was in control, while object pronouns like xe- "me" signified the person was not. The two types could be used alone or combined in transitive clauses, and they then functioned like subject and object in English:
 A-bebé = I-fly, "I can fly", "I flew".
 Xe pysyka = me catch, "Someone has caught me" or "I'm caught".
 A-î-pysyk = I-him-catch, "I have caught him".

Although Tupi verbs were not inflected, a number of pronominal variations existed to form a rather complex set of aspects regarding who did what to whom. That, together with the temporal inflection of the noun and the presence of tense markers like koára "today," made up a fully functional verbal system.

Word order played a key role in the formation of meaning:
 taba abá-im (village + man + tiny) = tiny man from the village
 taba-im abá = man from the small village

Tupi had no means to inflect words for gender, so used adjectives instead. Some of these were:
 apyŷaba = man, male
 kuñã = woman, female
 kunumĩ = boy, young male
 kuñãtãĩ = girl, young female
 mena = male animal
 kuñã = female animal

The notion of gender was expressed, once again, together with the notion of age and that of "humanity" or "animality".

The notion of plural was also expressed by adjectives or numerals:
 abá = man; abá-etá = many men

Unlike Indo-European languages, nouns were not implicitly masculine except for those provided with natural gender: abá "man" and kuñã[tã] "woman/girl"; for instance.

Without proper verbal inflection, all Tupi sentences were in the present or in the past. When needed, tense is indicated by adverbs like ko ara, "this day".

Adjectives and nouns, however, had temporal inflection:
 abáûera "he who was once a man"
 abárama "he who shall be a man someday"

That was often used as a semantic derivation process:
 akanga "head"
 akangûera "skull" (of a skeleton)
 abá "man"
 abárama "teenager"

With respect to syntax, Tupi was mostly SOV, but word order tended to be free, as the presence of pronouns made it easy to tell the subject from the object. Nevertheless, native Tupi sentences tended to be quite short, as the Indians were not used to complex rhetorical or literary uses.

Most of the available data about Old Tupi are based on the tupinambá dialect, spoken in what is now the Brazilian state of São Paulo, but there were other dialects as well.

According to Edward Sapir's categories, Old Tupi could be characterized as follows:

 With respect to the concepts expressed: complex, of pure relation, that is, it expresses material and relational content by means of affixes and word order, respectively.
 With respect to the manner in which such concepts are expressed: a) fusional-agglutinative, b) symbolic or of internal inflection (using reduplication of syllables, functionally differentiated).
 With respect to the degree of cohesion of the semantic elements of the sentence: synthetic.

 Sample vocabulary 

 Colors 
 îub = yellow, golden
 (s)oby = blue, green
 pirang = red
 ting = white
 (s)un = black

 Substances 
 (t)atá = fire
 itá = rock, stone, metal,
 y = water, river
 yby = earth, ground
 ybytu = air, wind

 People 
 abá = man (as opposed to woman), Indian or Native-American (as opposed to European), human being (as opposed to the animal world)
 aîuba = Frenchman (literally "yellow heads")
 maíra = Frenchman (the name of a mythological figure that the Indians associated with the Frenchmen)
 karaíba = foreigner, white man (literally means "spirit of a dead person"). Means also prophet.
 kunhã = woman
 kunhãtã'ĩ = girl
 kunhãmuku = young woman
 kunumĩ = boy
 kunumĩgûasu = young man
 morubixaba = chief
 peró = Portuguese (neologism, from "Pero", old variant of "Pedro" = "Peter", a very common Portuguese name)
 sy = mother
 tapy'yîa = slave (also the term for non-Tupi speaking Indians)

 The body 
 akanga = head
 îuru = mouth
 îyba = arm
 nambi = ear
 pó = hand
 py = foot
 py'a = heart
 (t)esá = eye
 (t)etimã = leg
 tĩ = nose
 (t)obá = face

 Animals 
 aîuru = parrot, lory, lorykeet
 arara = macaw, parrot
 îagûara = jaguar
 ka'apiûara = capybara
 mboîa = snake, cobra
 pirá = fish
 so'ó = game (animal)
 tapi'ira = tapir

 Plants 
 ka'api = grass, ivy (from which the word capybara comes)
 ka'a = plant, wood, forest
 kuri = pine
 (s)oba = leaf
 yba = fruit
 ybá = plant
 ybyrá = tree, (piece of) wood
 ybotyra = flower

 Society 
 oka = house
 taba = village

 Adjectives 
 beraba = brilliant, gleamy, shiny
 katu = good
 mirĩ, 'í = little
 panema = barren, contaminated, unhealthy, unlucky
 poranga = beautiful
 pûera, ûera = bad, old, dead
 (s)etá = many, much
 ûasu, usu = big

 Sample text 
This is the Lord's Prayer in Tupi, according to Anchieta:

 Presence of Tupi in Brazil 
As the basis for the língua geral, spoken throughout the country by white and Indian settlers alike until the early 18th century, and still heard in isolated pockets until the early 20th century, Tupi left a strong mark on the Portuguese language of Brazil, being by far its most distinctive source of modification.

Tupi has given the Portuguese language:
 A few thousand words (some of them hybrids or corrupted) for animals, plants, fruit and cultural entities.
 Multiple names of locations, including states (e.g. Paraná, Pará, Paraíba)

Some municipalities which have Tupi names:
 Iguaçu (y ûasú): great river
 Ipanema ('''y panema): bad, fishless water
 Itanhangá (itá + añãgá): devil's rock
 Itaquaquecetuba (takûakesétyba, from itá + takûara + kesé + tyba): where bamboo knives are made
 Itaúna ("itá + una"): black rock
 Jaguariúna (îagûara + 'í + una): small black jaguar
 Pacaembu (paka + embu): valley of the pacas.
 Paraíba (pará + aíba): bad to navigation or "bad river"
 Paranaíba (paranãíba, from paranã + aíba): dangerous sea
 Paraná-mirim (paranã + mirĩ): salty lagoon (literally: "small sea")
 Pindorama (from pindó, "palm tree", and (r)etama , country): palm country (this is the name the tupiniquins gave to the place where they lived, today known as Brazil).
 Piracaia ("pirá" + "caia"): fried fish
 Piraí (pirá + y): "fish water"
 Umuarama (ũbuarama, from ũbu + arama): where the cacti will grow

Among the many Tupi loanwords in Portuguese, the following are noteworthy for their widespread use:
 abacaxi (pineapple, literally: "fruit with thorns")
 jacaré (caiman)
 mirim (small or juvenile) as in "escoteiro-mirim" ("Boy Scout")
 perereca (a type of small frog, also slang for vulva), literally: "hopper"
 peteca (a type of badminton game played with bare hands) literally: "slap"
 piranha (a carnivorous fish, also slang for immoral women) literally: "toothed fish"
 pipoca (popcorn) literally "explosion of skin"
 piroca (originally meaning "bald", now a slang term for penis)
 pororoca (a tidal phenomenon in the Amazon firth) literally: "confusion"
 siri (crab)
 sucuri (anaconda)
 urubu (the Brazilian vulture)
 urutu (a kind of poisonous snake)
 uruçu (the common name for Melipona scutellaris)

It is interesting, however, that two of the most distinctive Brazilian animals, the jaguar and the tapir, are best known in Portuguese by non-Tupi names, onça and anta, despite being named in English with Tupi loanwords.

A significant number of Brazilians have Tupi names as well:
 Araci (female): ara sy, "mother of the day"
 Bartira, Potira (female): Ybotyra, "flower"
 Iara (female): 'y îara, lady of the lake
 Jaci (both): îasy, the moon
 Janaína (female): îandá una, a type of black bird
 Ubirajara (male): ybyrá îara, "lord of the trees/lance"
 Ubiratã (male): ybyrá-atã, "hard wood"

Some names of distinct Indian ancestry have obscure etymology because the tupinambá, like the Europeans, cherished traditional names which sometimes had become archaic. Some of such names are Moacir (reportedly meaning "son of pain") and Moema.

Literature 
Old Tupi literature was composed mainly of religious and grammatical texts developed by Jesuit missionaries working among the colonial Brazilian people. The greatest poet to express in written Tupi language, and its first grammarian was José de Anchieta, who wrote over eighty poems and plays, compiled at his Lírica Portuguesa e Tupi. Later Brazilian authors, writing in Portuguese, employed Tupi in the speech of some of their characters.

Recurrence 
Tupi is also remembered as distinctive trait of nationalism in Brazil. In the 1930s, Brazilian Integralism used it as the source of most of its catchphrases (like Anaûé meaning "you are my brother", the old Tupi salutation which was adopted as the Brazilian version of the German Sieg Heil, or the Roman "Ave") and terminology.

See also 
 Jesuit Reductions
 Língua Geral
 Língua Geral of São Paulo
 List of Brazil state name etymologies

Notes

References

Bibliography 
 ALVES Jr., Ozias. Uma breve história da língua tupi, a língua do tempo que o brasil era canibal.
 Ioseph de Anchieta: Arte de grammtica da lingoa mais usada na costa do Brasil. 1595.
 ANCHIETA, José de. Arte da gramática da língua mais usada na costa do Brasil. Rio de Janeiro: Imprensa Nacional, 1933.
 
 DI MAURO, Joubert J. Curso de Tupi Antigo.
 GOMES, Nataniel dos Santos. Síntese da Gramática Tupinambá.
 Perfil da língua tupi
 EDELWEISS, Frederico G. Tupis e Guaranis, Estudos de Etnonímia e Lingüística. Salvador: Museu do Estado da Bahia, 1947. 220 p.
 EDELWEISS, Frederico G. O caráter da segunda conjugação tupi. Bahia: Livraria Progresso Editora, 1958. 157 p.
 EDELWEISS, Frederico G. Estudos tupi e tupi-guaranis: confrontos e revisões. Rio de Janeiro: Livraria Brasiliana, 1969. 304 p.
 GOMES, Nataniel dos Santos. Observações sobre o Tupinambá. Monografia final do Curso de Especialização em Línguas Indígenas Brasileiras. Rio de Janeiro: Museu Nacional / UFRJ, 1999.
 LEMOS BARBOSA, A. Pequeno Vocabulário Tupi–Português. Rio de Janeiro: Livraria São José, 1951.
 LEMOS BARBOSA, A. Juká, o paradigma da conjugação tupí: estudo etimológico-gramatical in Revista Filológica, ano II, n. 12, Rio de Janeiro, 1941.
 LEMOS BARBOSA, A. Nova categoria gramatical tupi: a visibilidade e a invisibilidade nos demonstrativos in Verbum, tomo IV, fasc. 2, Rio de Janeiro, 1947.
 LEMOS BARBOSA, A. Pequeno vocabulário Tupi–Português. Rio de Janeiro: Livraria São José, 1955. (3ª ed.: Livraria São José, Rio de Janeiro, 1967)
 LEMOS BARBOSA, A. Curso de Tupi antigo. Rio de Janeiro: Livraria São José, 1956.
 LEMOS BARBOSA, A. Pequeno vocabulário Português-Tupi. Rio de Janeiro: Livraria São José, 1970.
 MICHAELE, Faris Antônio S. Tupi e Grego: Comparações Morfológicas em Geral. Ponta Grossa: UEPG, 1973. 126 p.
 
 RODRIGUES, Aryon Dall'Igna. Análise morfológica de um texto tupi. Separata da Revista "Logos", ano VII, N. 5. Curitiba: Tip. João Haupi, 1953.
 RODRIGUES, Aryon Dall'Igna. Morfologia do Verbo Tupi. Separata de "Letras". Curitiba, 1953.
 RODRIGUES, Aryon Dall'Igna. Descripción del tupinambá en el período colonial: el arte de José de Anchieta. Colóquio sobre a descrição das línguas ameríndias no período colonial. Ibero-amerikanisches Institut, Berlim.
 SAMPAIO, Teodoro. O Tupi na Geografia Nacional. São Paulo: Editora Nacional, 1987. 360 p.

External links 

 The art of the grammar of the Tupi language, by Father Luis Figueira
 Tupi Swadesh-vocabulary list (from Wiktionary's Swadesh-list appendix)
 "Abá nhe'enga oîebyr – Tradução: a língua dos índios está de volta", by Suzel Tunes essay in Portuguese.
An elementary course of Old Tupi (in Portuguese)
 Another course of Old Tupi (in Portuguese)
 Ancient Tupi Home Page
 Tupi–Portuguese dictionary (with non-standard Tupi spelling)
 Sources on Tupinambá at the Curt Nimuendaju Digital Library
 TuLaR (Tupian Languages Resources)

Agglutinative languages
Extinct languages of South America
Tupi–Guarani languages
Cultural history of Brazil
Languages attested from the 16th century